Arts Academy in the Woods, also known as AAW, is a charter, magnet high school located in Fraser, Michigan, United States.  The school's educational focus is on the arts; primarily visual art, music, and performance art.

Overview

Arts Academy in the Woods is chartered by the Macomb Intermediate School District's Board of Education, which oversees its operations, including finances and curriculum.  The school is tuition-free and open to all Michigan students, grades 9-12, with an interest in the arts.  Any secondary school student who qualifies as a resident of the State of Michigan is eligible to attend.

The Academy opened in August 2001, initially only to students entering the 9th grade. The 2002-2003 year included 9th and 10th grade students. 11th grade was added in 2003-2004, and finally, a senior class (12th grade) was added in the 2004-2005 school year.

AAW allows students to major in the Arts, while also attending "regular" high school classes.  The arts program is combined with a full academic curriculum including math, science, English, and languages.

Media

School Year 2008-2009

School Year 2007-2008

References

External links 
 "artsacademywoods" YouTube channel
 
 https://m.youtube.com/channel/UCPcy_s6hrKgdtZPqSCsdTYA “AAWACTINGDEPARTMENT”
 information page at greatschools.net

Charter schools in Michigan
Magnet schools in Michigan
Schools in Macomb County, Michigan
Public high schools in Michigan
2001 establishments in Michigan